Almeida is a town and municipality in Boyacá Department, Colombia, part of the province of the Eastern Boyacá Province.

Borders 
North with Somondoco, Garagoa and Macanal Municipalities
West with: Somondoco municipality
South with: Chivor, Macanal, Somondoco Municipalities of Boyacá and the Cundinamarca municipality of Ubalá
East with: Macanal and Chivor Municipalities

Another Facts 
Market Day: Sunday
Distance from Tunja: 125 km
Elevation: 2200 m
Extensión: 57 km²
Median temperature: 19 °C
Foundation: September 24 of 1907
Demonym: Almeidunos
Dane code: 15022

Municipalities of Boyacá Department